Alfred Gindrat (29 October 1883 – 26 January 1951) was a French footballer. He played in three matches for the France national football team from 1911 to 1912. He was also named in France's squad for the football tournament at the 1912 Summer Olympics, but the French side withdrew from the competition.

References

External links
 

1883 births
1951 deaths
French footballers
France international footballers
Place of birth missing
Association football defenders
Stade Français (association football) players
Red Star F.C. players